Aaron Luke Smith (born 21 November 1988) is a New Zealand rugby union player. A halfback, Smith plays for the Highlanders in Super Rugby where he is the club's all time leader in caps, and for Manawatu in the ITM Cup. He has won 117 caps for New Zealand (the All Blacks) and is their most-capped back.

Smith played for New Zealand Maori in 2010, and was first selected for the All Blacks in 2012. He was a key member of the 2015 Rugby World Cup winning team.

Provincial rugby
Smith made his debut for Manawatu in the 2008 Air New Zealand Cup at the age of 19, making several substitute appearances for the Turbos. This included the historic 25–24 win over Canterbury in Round 1 and the 38–38 draw with Waikato in Round 3.

For the 2009 Air New Zealand Cup, Smith established himself as the first-choice half-back for Manawatu, starting all 13 games over the course of the season and scoring his first representative try. He continued as the starter in the 2010 ITM Cup, and established himself as one of the top half-backs in the competition and earning a Super Rugby contract.

In the 2011 ITM Cup, Smith continued to improve and had a successful season, scoring five tries helping the improved Manawatu squad which reached the Championship final.

Super Rugby

Smith was included in the Blues wider training group for the 2010 Super 14 season, but did not see any game action for the Auckland-based side.

For the 2011 Super Rugby season, Smith signed for the Highlanders, coached by Jamie Joseph, who had previously coached Smith with New Zealand Māori. Smith had a successful debut season, beating out Sean Romans for the job as backup to starting half-back (and All Black) Jimmy Cowan, and made 12 appearances including 3 starts.

International career

On the back of his strong performances for Manawatu, Smith, of Ngāti Kahungunu descent, was selected to New Zealand Māori for their 2010 Centenary Series. He came on as a substitute against the New Zealand Barbarians after Chris Smylie suffered a fractured cheekbone, and started in the squad's historic victories over Ireland and England.

On the back of a successful Highlanders season Smith made his All Blacks debut on 9 June 2012, against Ireland.
By the time of the 2013 season Smith had become the first choice halfback for the national team.

Smith has been selected for every New Zealand squad since 2013, including the 2015 Rugby World Cup squad where he started in all the knockout games. Smith became the leader of the All Blacks' haka in 2016, following the retirement of Keven Mealamu and Liam Messam's decision to swap to New Zealand's rugby 7s squad, first leading the Haka against Wales at Eden Park.

Smith played his 50th international test match in the final test against Wales, during the 2016 tour, alongside lock Brodie Retallick, with whom he debuted. Smith lost his place as the All Blacks' Haka leader later in the season due to off-field controversy, as well as strong competition for a starting place, from TJ Perenara. Smith was caught meeting a woman for sexual intercourse at an airport before getting on a flight for All Black duty. Smith was in a relationship at the time, to the woman that would be his future wife. Smith was retained as a regular starter into the 2017 season, when he started in all three tests against the touring British & Irish Lions.

Smith became the most-capped scrum-half in New Zealand's history in the 2018 season, breaking Justin Marshall's long-standing record on 17 November 2018.  Despite the ongoing competition for his starting place through TJ Perenara, Smith was chosen to start against Ireland. Smith, during his record-breaking performance, failed to perform well, with the All Blacks losing 9-16. In March 2021 it was announced by New Zealand Rugby that Smith had signed a new contract with the All Blacks, the Highlanders and Manawatu that will see him stay in New Zealand until 2023.

Honours 
New Zealand
Rugby World Cup: 2015
The Rugby Championship: 2012, 2013, 2014, 2016, 2017, 2018
Bledisloe Cup: 2012, 2013, 2014, 2015, 2016, 2017, 2018, 2019, 2020, 2021, 2022
Dave Gallaher Trophy: 2013 (2), 2016, 2017, 2018
Freedom Cup: 2012, 2013, 2014, 2015, 2016, 2017, 2018, 2019
Hillary Shield: 2013, 2014 (2), 2018
British & Irish Lions series: 2017 (drawn series – shared title)

References

External links

Aaron Smith | Rugby Database Profile
Highlanders profile
ESPN profile

1988 births
New Zealand rugby union players
New Zealand Māori rugby union players
New Zealand international rugby union players
Highlanders (rugby union) players
Māori All Blacks players
Rugby union scrum-halves
Manawatu rugby union players
Ngāti Kahungunu people
People educated at Feilding High School
People from Feilding
Living people
Rugby union players from Palmerston North